West Kill flows into the Schoharie Creek by North Blenheim, New York.
A different West Kill flows into Schoharie Creek further south.

References

Rivers of New York (state)
Rivers of Schoharie County, New York